Charles Frederick Hughes (March 2, 1943 – October 24, 1971) was an American football player, a wide receiver in the National Football League from 1967 to 1971. , he is the only NFL player to die on the field during a game.

Early years
Born in Philadelphia, Pennsylvania, Hughes moved with his family to Texas when he was young, along with his 12 siblings. Hughes attended high school in Abilene at Abilene High School. Hughes was also an avid golfer, having played with Chi Chi Rodriguez and Lee Trevino.

College career
Hughes played college football at Texas Western College, now the University of Texas at El Paso, where he is still listed in the all-time football records; his accomplishments include:
 The most all-purpose yards in a single game, 401 in 1965 against North Texas State (he is also second with 360 the same year against Arizona State) 
 The most yards per reception for a single game, 34.9, also in 1965 against North Texas—this is also an NCAA record
 The most receptions in a single game, 17, also against Arizona State in 1965
 Second in all-purpose yards for a season, with 2044 in 1966
 First in all-purpose yards per game for a season, 204 in 1965
 Second in all-purpose yards per game for his career with 132
 Fifth in all-purpose yards all-time with 3,989
 Second in career receiving touchdowns with 19 and yardage with 2,882

He was inducted into the UTEP Athletics Hall of Fame in 2006.

Professional career
Hughes was selected in the fourth round by the Philadelphia Eagles in the 1967 NFL/AFL draft and played three seasons with the Eagles before he was traded to the Detroit Lions prior to the start of the 1970 season. Although listed as a wide receiver he saw most action on special teams, being a backup at wide receiver. In his five-year career he caught 15 passes.

Death
Hughes had suffered an injury in an August 1971 preseason game against the Buffalo Bills, which led to him collapsing in the locker room. He was hospitalized, but doctors were unable to diagnose what was wrong (suspecting a spleen injury) and he was released, despite never fully recovering. Hughes, who would suffer from what he believed was acid reflux and other maladies for the remaining two months of his life, insisted on continuing to play, saying that the pain he was experiencing was "not that bad."

On October 24, 1971, the Lions hosted the Chicago Bears at Tiger Stadium. Late in the 4th quarter, with Detroit trailing 28–23, the Lions were driving into Chicago territory and Hughes, who entered the game as an injury replacement, caught a pass from quarterback Greg Landry for 32 yards and a first down at the Bears' 37-yard line.

Three plays later, Landry threw a pass that tight end Charlie Sanders dropped near the end zone. Hughes, a decoy on the play, began running back to the huddle with 1:02 showing on the clock. Suddenly, he dropped to the turf clutching his chest around the 20-yard line. Hughes collapsed near Bears linebacker Dick Butkus, who saw him begin to convulse violently on the field. Butkus motioned to the sideline frantically to get Hughes assistance.

Both teams' doctors and trainers, along with a physician who happened to be attending the game, ran to Hughes to try to save him. An ambulance was called for and arrived to take Hughes to Henry Ford Hospital, where he was pronounced dead at 5:34 pm that afternoon. He was 28 years old. The game was played to its conclusion in front of a now-stunned silent crowd in Tiger Stadium, with the Bears' lead holding. The Lions awaited word of Hughes' condition after the game and the players were informed once word had broken that he was dead.

A postmortem examination revealed that Hughes was suffering from undiagnosed and advanced arteriosclerosis (one of his coronary arteries was 75% blocked) and that he had a family history of heart disease. The direct cause of death was a coronary thrombosis, which caused a massive myocardial infarction that cut off the blood flow to his heart. Hughes was buried in San Antonio, Texas, and all 40 of his Lions teammates attended his funeral, including head coach Joe Schmidt. He was survived by his widow, Sharon Leah, and by his son, who was 1 year and 11 months old at the time, Brandon Shane. A $10,000 trust fund was set up for his son by an insurance company. His widow filed a $21.5 million malpractice lawsuit against Henry Ford Hospital in 1972 for not diagnosing his condition after the Bills game. The lawsuit was settled on October 3, 1974, for an undisclosed amount of money.

See also
List of American football players who died during their career
List of sportspeople who died during their career
Damar Hamlin, the only other player known to have suffered an in-game cardiac arrest

References

External links

Sports Reference – collegiate statistics – Chuck Hughes
 

1943 births
1971 deaths
Players of American football from Philadelphia
Players of American football from Texas
Sportspeople from Abilene, Texas
American football wide receivers
UTEP Miners football players
Philadelphia Eagles players
Detroit Lions players
National Football League players with retired numbers
Sports deaths in Michigan
Sports competitors who died in competition